Margaret Wood may refer to:

 Margaret Wood (courtier), servant of Anne of Denmark and nun
 Margaret Wood Bancroft  (1893–1986), American naturalist and explorer
Margaret Wood (archaeologist) (born 1908), English archaeologist
Margaret Wood (fashion designer) (born 1950), Navajo-Seminole fashion designer
Maggie Hassan (Margaret Coldwell Wood, born 1958), American politician